James W. Boyle (26 July 1922–8 May 1971), better known as Jimmy Boyle, was a Penangite musician of Eurasian extraction. He composed and wrote the lyrics to Untuk Negeri Kita, which was adopted as the state anthem of Penang a year after his death.

Life 
Boyle was born on 26 July 1922 on Kelawai Road, Georgetown, Penang (in what was then the Straits Settlements) to Jeanne Moissinac and John Walter Patrick Boyle, ethnic Eurasian Bumiputera parents of mixed French (maternal) and Irish (paternal) descent. He attended St. Xavier's Institution, and continued his education at Raffles College, Singapore. In 1946, he was hired by St. Xavier's to teach.

Boyle would become a composer for the Classical Saxophone Quarter, NW University Brass Ensemble. His work has received praise from the likes of Charles Lloyd (jazz musician) and Jack Teagarden, and has been played on BBC and Voice of America.

A proud moment in his life came about when one of his compositions, Kemegahan Negaraku (My Country's Majesty), was chosen to be played at the inaugural raising of the Malaysian flag, on 31 August 1957.

Death 
On 8 May 1971, Boyle passed away of an intracerebral haemorrhage.

Reference list 

1922 births
Malaysian Roman Catholics
Malaysian people of French descent
1971 deaths
Malaysian musicians
People from Penang
Malaysian people of Irish descent